Wilbur Kincaid Rodgers, nicknamed "Rawmeat Bill," (April 18, 1887 – December 24, 1978) was a backup infielder in Major League Baseball, playing mainly as a second baseman from  through  for the Cleveland Indians (1915), Boston Red Sox (1915) and Cincinnati Reds (1915–1916). He was born in Pleasant Ridge, Ohio.

In a two-season career, Rodgers was a .243 hitter (65-for-268) with 30 run and 19 RBI in 102 games, including 15 doubles, four triples, 11 stolen bases, and a .316 on-base percentage without home runs. In 83 fielding appearances at second base (75), shortstop (7) and third base, he posted a collective .947 fielding percentage (20 errors in 376 chances).

He also was a player/manager in the Minor leagues during 22 seasons between 1918 and 1951, and managed the Peoria Redwings of the All-American Girls Professional Baseball League during the 1946 season.

Rodgers died at the age of 91 in Goliad, Texas.

External links

 Baseball Reference
 Retrosheet

1887 births
1978 deaths
Major League Baseball second basemen
Boston Red Sox players
Cincinnati Reds players
Cleveland Indians players
Albany Senators players
Denver Bears players
Peoria Tractors players
Portland Beavers players
Sacramento Senators players
Sacramento Solons managers
All-American Girls Professional Baseball League managers
Baseball players from Cincinnati
Chattanooga Lookouts managers
Portland Beavers managers